The Type 87 82mm Mortar is a Chinese infantry mortar developed by Norinco in 1987. It is a replacement for the older Type 67 82mm mortar used at the battalion level. An 81 mm version called the W87 was also developed for export markets.

Variants
Type 87: basic model 82 mm.
W87: 81mm caliber model for export.
 The Type 87 mortar is also used on the YW304 variant of the Type 85 AFV

Operators

Sri Lanka

References

Cold War weapons of China
Infantry mortars of the People's Republic of China
82 mm mortars